Mississippi Highway 446 (MS 446) is a state highway in northwest Mississippi. The route starts at MS 1 near Lobdell, and it travels east through the Dahomey National Wildlife Refuge and Skene. The road enters Boyle, traveling through the center of the town as a boulevard. The route ends at U.S. Route 61 (US 61) and US 278 on the eastern side of Boyle, and the road continues as Peavine Road. The highway was designated in 1955 along its current alignment, after the state had funded projects to improve the preexisting county road. The route was fully paved in asphalt by 1957.

Route description

All of MS 446 is located within Bolivar County. The route is legally defined in Mississippi Code § 65-3-3, and all of it is maintained by the Mississippi Department of Transportation (MDOT), as part of the Mississippi State Highway System.

MS 446 starts at a T-intersection with MS 1 south of Lobdell and travels eastward through farmland. East of Neblett Road, the route enters the Dahomey National Wildlife Refuge. An entrance to the visitor center is located on the road. Near Woodruff Road, MS 446 leaves the refuge and crosses over Bogue Phalia. The route continues traveling through farmland and crosses over smaller creeks. The road intersects Shaw–Skene Road at the unincorporated area of Skene. The route enters the town of Boyle east of Cypress Drive, and turns into a boulevard near the center of the town. Known as T.M. Jones Highway inside the town, the road crosses over Jones Bayou near Bayou Avenue. The route ends at US 61 and US 278, and the road continues eastward as Peavine Road.

History
In late 1948, the Mississippi State Highway Commission began letting projects along a county road traversing from Lobdell to Boyle within Bolivar County. The first project was proposed in November, for grading and gravel surfacing a  section of the road. One month later, another project to grade and surface another  section was proposed. In February 1955, MS 446 was designated for a highway in Bolivar County, along with the name "Margaret A. Green Memorial Highway". A project to pave  of the road in asphalt began one month later, with a cost of $216,156. By 1956, the route was added to the state highway map, starting from MS 1 and ending at US 61. The majority of road was paved in gravel, and a small section near Boyle paved in asphalt. One year later, all of the route was paved in asphalt. In 1990, the Dahomey National Wildlife Refuge was created, spanning over parts of MS 446.

Major intersections

References

External links

446
Transportation in Bolivar County, Mississippi